Jürg Stahl (born 16 January 1968, in Winterthur) is a Swiss politician of the Swiss People's Party. He was a member of the National Council for the canton of Zürich from 1999 to 2019 and served as the president of the National Council from 2016 to 2017.

Biography 

Stahl underwent advanced training as a pharmacist in Neuchâtel and graduated in 1992. He supplemented his education with a diploma in small business management at the University of St. Gallen. Between 1996 and 2004, Stahl ran a pharmacy in Winterthur. In 2004 he was elected as a member of the management board of the health insurance company Group Mutuel.

Stahl's career in politics began as a member of Winterthur's municipal council between 1994 and 2001. In 2001, he missed the election to Winterthur's "Stadtrat" (city  executive) by a single vote.

Stahl was elected to the National Council in 1999 and reelected in 2003, 2007, 2011, and 2015. In 2016, Stahl was elected to succeed Christa Markwalder as president of the National Council, only days after he had been elected as president of Swiss Olympic (succeeding Jörg Schild). In June 2018, he accepted a position with Schweizerischen Drogistenverband, the Swiss druggists association.

He announced in February 2019 that he would not run for another term in the National Council. In 2020, Stahl was elected as the new president of the supervisory body of the Swiss National Science Foundation, replacing interim president Felicitas Pauss.

Stahl served in the Swiss Air Force with the rank of major. He is married and has a daughter.

References

External links 
 Personal website
 Personal page on parlament.ch

1968 births
Living people
Members of the National Council (Switzerland)
Presidents of the National Council (Switzerland)
Swiss People's Party politicians
Swiss military officers